Edwin Brown High School, also known as Edwin Brown Alternative High School, was an alternative high school in Redmond, Oregon, United States. It merged into Redmond High School in late 2009.

Academics
In 2002, the school was placed on the No Child Left Behind expulsion watch list for the first time.

In 2008, 32% of the school's seniors received their high school diploma. Of 63 students, 20 graduated, 20 dropped out, 4 received a modified diploma, and 19 are still in high school.

In September 2009, the school closed due to a budget shortfall, moving the students to the Hartman campus of Redmond High School.

References

Alternative schools in Oregon
Buildings and structures in Redmond, Oregon
High schools in Deschutes County, Oregon
Educational institutions disestablished in 2009
Defunct schools in Oregon
1998 establishments in Oregon
2009 disestablishments in Oregon
Educational institutions established in 1998